This is a complete list of films in the Warren Miller series of ski films. Miller directed the films through White Winter Heat (1987), his last. He continued to be involved in producing the movies until 2004, primarily by providing the narration. The movies after this he was not involved with in any way, even though his narration is at times used. Warren Miller Entertainment, which is currently owned by Outside Inc., is currently responsible for producing the annual films.

In January 2023 longtime Warren Miller collaborator, Chris Patterson, announced that, for the first time in 74 years, 2023 would not see the premiere of a new Warren Miller film, stating, "Due to financial challenges at Outside, the executives have chosen to assemble the future movies entirely with “existing footage” – no need for a camera crew, plane tickets, lift tickets and for that matter, no need for athletes or snow."

Other Warren Miller ski films

References

External links
 Warren Miller Entertainment
 Shout Factory (DVD and Blu-ray releases)

Lists of films by common content
American skiing films